Gaori station is a station on the Ui LRT located in Suyu-dong, Gangbuk-gu, Seoul, South Korea. It opened on 2 September 2017.

References

Seoul Metropolitan Subway stations
Railway stations opened in 2017
Metro stations in Gangbuk District